Port San Carlos is located on the northern bank of the inlet known as Port San Carlos, off San Carlos Water on the Western coast of East Falkland, in the Falkland Islands. It is sometimes nicknamed "KC" after former owner Keith Cameron.

The port takes its name from the ship San Carlos which visited in 1768.

It is north of its namesake San Carlos.

History
It is most noted for being the first landing place of British forces during the 1982 Falklands War; it was codenamed "Green Beach", and was part of Operation Sutton.

References

Populated places on East Falkland